Philip McCloy (April 1896 – 1972) was a Scottish footballer who played as a full back. McCloy won two caps for Scotland during a seven-year spell with Ayr United. He then played 157 times for Manchester City between 1925 and 1929.

On his international debut in 1924, he was selected alongside fellow newcomer and Ayr United teammate Jock Smith in the Scottish defence against England at Wembley, the match ending in a draw. The following year he was on the winning side in the same fixture at Hampden Park, this time partnered by Jimmy McStay of Celtic.

McCloy was later player-manager of French club Rennes for a short period in 1933.

References

External links 

London Hearts profile

1896 births
1972 deaths
People from Uddingston
Association football defenders
Scotland international footballers
Scottish Football League players
English Football League players
Scottish footballers
Ayr United F.C. players
Clyde F.C. players
Manchester City F.C. players
Chester City F.C. players
Cork City F.C. players
Stade Rennais F.C. players
Ligue 1 players
Association football player-managers
Workington A.F.C. players
Kidderminster Harriers F.C. players
Scottish football managers
Scottish expatriate footballers
Expatriate footballers in France
Expatriate association footballers in the Republic of Ireland
Expatriate football managers in France
Scottish expatriate sportspeople in Ireland
Scottish expatriate sportspeople in France
Ligue 1 managers
League of Ireland players
Stade Rennais F.C. managers
Footballers from South Lanarkshire
Date of death missing
FA Cup Final players